Adidas Power Soccer is a football simulation video game developed and published by British developer Psygnosis and sponsored by German sportswear company Adidas. Released in 1996, the game launched versions for PlayStation and Windows.

Gameplay 
Adidas Power Soccer used motion-captured animation for real soccer players from the German, Italian, and English leagues.

Development
A Sega Saturn version was ported by Perfect Entertainment and was reportedly close to completion before cancellation. Saturn Power magazine reported that it would have been "placed between" Adidas Power Soccer and Adidas Power Soccer 98 in terms of features and gameplay, but that all in-game sounds had to replaced entirely as they were the copyright of Psygnosis.

Reception

{{Video game reviews
| GR = 60.42% (PS1)
|rev1=The Charlotte Observer
|rev1Score=2.5/5
}}

In the United Kingdom, it was among the nineteen best-selling PlayStation games of 1996, according to HMV.Next Generation reviewed the PlayStation version of the game, rating it three stars out of five, and stated that "If you're looking for the perfect soccer sim, Worldwide Soccer II is still the only choice, but Adidas Power Soccer is more than worth the purchase if you're in for some far-out arcade action." GameSpot rated the game 7/10, stating that Power Soccer "rises high above the standard soccer fare... fans will love all the detail and options".

ReviewsElectric Playground (1996)IGN (Nov 21, 1996)Game Revolution (Oct, 1996)Computer and Video Games (CVG) (Aug 15, 2001)PC Zone (1993-2010) (Aug 13, 2001)Gamesmania.de'' (1997)

References

1996 video games
Adidas
Association football video games
Cancelled Sega Saturn games
PlayStation (console) games
Psygnosis games
Single-player video games
Video games developed in France
Windows games